The Milwaukee Brewers' 1995 season involved the Brewers' finishing fourth in the American League Central with a record of 65 wins and 79 losses. The 1995 Brewers were the last Major League Baseball team to use a bullpen car, until the 2018 Arizona Diamondbacks.

Offseason
 October 14, 1994: Alex Diaz was selected off waivers from the Brewers by the Seattle Mariners.

Regular season

Season standings

Record vs. opponents

Notable transactions
 March 24, 1995: Joe Oliver was signed as a free agent by the Brewers.
 April 7, 1995: B. J. Surhoff was signed as a free agent by the Brewers.

Draft picks
 June 1, 1995: Geoff Jenkins was drafted by the Brewers in the 1st round (9th pick) of the 1995 Major League Baseball draft. Player signed July 17, 1995.

Roster

Player stats

Batting

Starters by position
Note: Pos = Position; G = Games played; AB = At bats; H = Hits; Avg. = Batting average; HR = Home runs; RBI = Runs batted in

Other batters
Note: G = Games played; AB = At bats; H = Hits; Avg. = Batting average; HR = Home runs; RBI = Runs batted in

Pitching

Starting pitchers
Note: G = Games pitched; IP = Innings pitched; W = Wins; L = Losses; ERA = Earned run average; SO = Strikeouts

Other pitchers
Note: G = Games pitched; IP = Innings pitched; W = Wins; L = Losses; ERA = Earned run average; SO = Strikeouts

Relief pitchers
Note: G = Games pitched; W = Wins; L = Losses; SV = Saves; ERA = Earned run average; SO = Strikeouts

Farm system

The Brewers' farm system consisted of seven minor league affiliates in 1995. The Brewers operated a Dominican Summer League team as a co-op with the Houston Astros. The Beloit Snappers won the Midwest League championship, and the Helena Brewers won the Pioneer League championship.

References

1995 Milwaukee Brewers team at Baseball-Reference
1995 Milwaukee Brewers team page at www.baseball-almanac.com

Milwaukee Brewers seasons
Milwaukee Brewers season
Milwaukee Brew